Episcepsis grisescens is a moth of the family Erebidae. It was described by George Hampson in 1914. It is found in Venezuela.

References

Euchromiina
Moths described in 1914